Platers may refer to the following Canadian junior ice hockey teams:
 Guelph Platers
 Owen Sound Platers

See also:
 The Platters a successful vocal group of the early rock and roll era